Zygfryd Słoma (28 October 1927 – 24 January 2007) was a Polish footballer. He played in two matches for the Poland national football team in 1950.

References

External links
 

1927 births
2007 deaths
Polish footballers
Poland international footballers
Place of birth missing
Association footballers not categorized by position